Nabil Sabio Azadi; ; born 12 October 1991) is an Iranian-New Zealand artist who is based in Brisbane, Australia. He is known primarily for his book, For You The Traveller, a hand-bound travel guide.

Early life and career
Azadi was born in Otahuhu, Auckland, New Zealand on 12 October 1991 to Iranian Baháʼí parents. Ehsan Azadi, an Industrial Designer, and Simin Azadi had fled from their country to Venezuela in 1979 just prior to the Iranian Revolution. Eventually they settled in suburban Auckland where Azadi was raised with an older brother and sister (Roya Alma Azadi).

By age 13 he was working as a photographer for local modeling agencies and saved his money to travel alone for the first time, "playing [his] London-based [brother] off [his] parents so [he] could spend more time in Paris on [his] own." He continued travelling around the world on his own from this age – particularly to Paris where he would later create his first commissioned artworks.

Azadi attributes "[his] extreme sense of fluidity around the idea of home to [his] parents and their own extreme journey," adding that "[his] concept of home is [himself] and almost everywhere. It has nothing to do with where [he sleeps]."

London, Paris, New York City and Melbourne
In 2008, just after turning 17, Azadi began working for Dazed & Confused, a British fashion magazine in London, United Kingdom. The publication described the artist at the time as "a renaissance man who concerns himself with anything particularly beautiful, ugly or useful." He became a writer and a photographer for Dazed Digital, covering the menswear fashion shows at Paris Fashion Week for them. During this period Azadi partly lived in London, Paris, New York City, and Melbourne, Australia where he attended the University of Melbourne. Azadi has described this wandering and his work in magazine publishing as a "very miscalculated mystic pursuit".

By age 19 he was in New York City, working for magazines and the fashion design industry. In New York, the life was difficult and it was the matter of survival. Azadi has noted the effect of this period on his art, stating: "I have good coping mechanisms sometimes for extreme things. I grew up very quickly in most ways. I like the idea of survival. I mean sometimes then I would wish I wouldn’t survive and it would just be over ... I felt like Atlas. I’d scratch myself to pieces at night but ... I smile when I tell the stories because it led me to my art. Since I was a kid it was always ruin and triumph and struggle and fighting."

Later that year Azadi returned to Australia to pursue his photography and sculpture. In 2012 he stated to Portable: "I was moving around too much and asking a lot of myself and I don't think anything amplifies a sense of unease like being homeless. I recently moved to Australia and in doing so ... I have discovered that I am not a little Tyler Brûlé in waiting—I like utes, having a lot of space, my dog and not having to deal with much bullshit."

Career

For You The Traveller
In 2012 Azadi self-published For You The Traveller, an art book created in a limited edition of 200 copies. For You The Traveller was a hand-bound guide to the world which contained the names, personal stories and telephone numbers of people across five continents who are willing "to offer themselves a port-of-call to any traveller passing through their region and bearing the book." The book was printed on recycled paper and each copy was covered in salvaged rabbit fur. It was well-received internationally.

The book was named "the best guide book ever" by Huffington Post critic Andrew Losowsky for its beauty, humanity and its "stunning [use of] letterpress-style typography of varying sizes and ... hand drawn maps to create moments of creativity and stillness." Losowsky stated "most importantly [For You The Traveller] is so beautifully idiosyncratic and personal that it suggests a chart of the overriding emotions of its cities" and that "there is no other book like it."

For You The Maker
In May 2014, Azadi's Website announced that he was making a new art book in participation with several notable designers, musicians, and writers, as well as the multinational German stationery brand, Faber-Castell. Entitled For You The Maker, the book is described as "an exercise book for life" and amongst its list of contributors are fashion designers Rick Owens, Yohji Yamamoto, and his daughter Limi Yamamoto; British author Philip Pullman and Australian musician Megan Washington. For You The Maker is slated to be released in early 2015.

Selected works
 2012 For You The Traveller (Self-published; OCLC 877008818)
 2014 For You: An Exercise Book For Life (Announced)

References

External links

 
 
 

1991 births
Living people
New Zealand contemporary artists
Artists from Auckland
New Zealand people of Iranian descent
21st-century New Zealand artists
21st-century New Zealand male artists
21st-century New Zealand writers
Photographers from Auckland